Unleash the Archers is a Canadian power metal band from Victoria, British Columbia, currently signed with Napalm Records. The band plays a fusion of traditional heavy metal with power metal and melodic death metal.

History

2007–2015: Formation and indie years
Unleash the Archers was formed in late 2007 by vocalist Brittney Hayes (a.k.a. Brittney Slayes) and drummer Scott Buchanan with former member Brayden Dyczkowski on guitar, whom Scott had played with previously in an independent death metal project. Former member Mike Selman was brought on after his departure from Canadian death metal band Meatlocker Seven. The position of bass player was unfilled for the first few months of Unleash The Archers' career, until Zahk Hedstrom joined in October 2007 to complete the lineup. In late 2008 the band recorded a self-titled four song demo, which featured two songs they would end up re-recording for their first studio album.

Their debut studio album Behold The Devastation was recorded with Jason Hywell Martin at Omega Mediacore Studios in Richmond, BC and was released independently in August 2009. This was the only album to feature the band's original lineup in its entirety.

The band's second album Demons Of The AstroWaste was recorded with Nick Engwer and Stu McKillop at the Hive Soundlab in Burnaby, BC and was released independently in May 2011. This album included the first appearance of guitarist Grant Truesdell, who provided solos for their songs Battle in the Shadow (of the Mountain) and The Outlander. He would step in as the new guitar player later that same year after the departure of Mike Selman prior to the recording. The album was a concept album based on the exploits of a mercenary in space and was set far into the future.

In 2012 the band released Defy The Skies. This album was a three-song EP released solely on 7-inch vinyl. A bonus fourth track titled ‘Arise’ was given to those that pre-ordered, but was later released on the band's Bandcamp page in digital format only.  This record also marked the departure of original bassist Zahk Hedstrom.

2015–present: Signing with Napalm Records
In February 2015 the band announced their signing with Napalm Records, and soon after the title, track listing and release date for their upcoming studio album Time Stands Still were revealed.  The album was released in Europe on June 26 and in North America on July 10.  The album was originally slated for a late-Summer/early-Fall 2014 release, but the release was pushed back after the band was signed by Napalm Records. This album was the first without Brayden Dyczkowski, who had been one of the main songwriters up until his parting with the band in late 2013; this lineup change has affected the band's sound and driven it towards a more traditional heavy metal direction with the addition of Andrew Kingsley, who is also trained in jazz, on guitar.

On May 26, 2015, the band released the "Tonight We Ride" video, inspired by Mad Max Beyond Thunderdome. The video was filmed in the Nevada desert, using props from the Death Guild Thunderdome camp at Burning Man.

Since leaving for a tour of Europe in November 2016, Unleash the Archers mentioned they would be recording a new album at the end of 2016. This album would be the first to include then bassist, Nikko Whitworth.  The first single, "Cleanse the Bloodlines" was released on April 8, 2017. Apex was released on June 2, 2017 through Napalm Records.  The album debuted at No. 3 on iTunes metal charts, and became their first to make Billboard charts.  The album debuted at No. 9 Heatseeker, No. 29 Top Hard Music Albums, No. 29 Record Label Independent Current Albums, No. 34 Top Current Rock Albums, No. 116 Overall Digital Albums, No. 119 Top Current Albums, and No. 197 Top Albums by Strata.  It also debuted at No. 12 on Canadian Top Hard Music chart.  The band announced they would be touring Europe, accompanying Orden Ogan, to promote the album in the fall of 2017, with a US tour to be announced. In end of January it was announced that bassist Nikko Witworth had decided to leave the band.

Brittney Hayes gave interviews and tweeted saying that they are currently working on an EP of covers with a "bit of a UTA spin" on them. 

On August 30, 2019, the band released the first single off of the EP Explorers, a cover of Stan Rogers' "Northwest Passage". The full EP was released October 11, 2019.

In August 2020, they released their fifth full-length album, Abyss, continuing the story of Apex. They also revealed they have plans to release a graphic novel with the story told on both albums.

On December 6, 2021 they announced via social media posts that bassist Nick Miller had become a full time member of the band.

On May 3rd, 2022 the band announced via an Instagram post that they are in the writing phase of their next album. 

On November 11, 2022 Brittney Slayes commented during an Instagram livestream that their next album was also a concept album, this time with a post-apocalyptic setting, and that they were aiming for a Fall 2023 release.

Band members 

Current
Brittney Hayes (a.k.a. Brittney Slayes) – clean vocals (2007–present)
Scott Buchanan – drums (2007–present)
Grant Truesdell – guitars, unclean vocals (2011–present)
Andrew Kingsley – guitars, clean vocals (2014–present)
Nick Miller – bass (2021-present, 2018–2021 touring musician)

Previous
Mike Selman – guitars (2007–2011)
Zahk Hedstrom – bass (2007–2012)
Brad Kennedy – bass (2012–2014)
Brayden Dyczkowski – guitars, unclean vocals (2007–2014)
Kyle Sheppard – bass (2014–2016)
Nikko Whitworth – bass (2016–2018)

Timeline

Discography

Studio albums 
2009: Behold the Devastation (independent)
2011: Demons of the AstroWaste (independent)
2015: Time Stands Still (Napalm Records)
2017: Apex (Napalm Records)
2020: Abyss (Napalm Records)

EPs 
2012: Defy the Skies (Spread the Metal Records)
2019: Explorers (Napalm Records)
2020: Abysswave (Abyss earbook; Napalm Records)
2022: Acoustipex (Apex earbook; Napalm Records)

Demos 
2009: Unleash the Archers (Independent)
2014: Dreamcrusher (single; Independent)

Videography/singles 
2011: "Dawn of Ages", taken from Demons of the AstroWaste

2012: "General of the Dark Army" taken from Demons of the AstroWaste

2015: "Tonight We Ride", taken from Time Stands Still

2015: "Test Your Metal", taken from Time Stands Still

2016: "Time Stands Still", taken from Time Stands Still

2017: "Cleanse the Bloodlines", taken from Apex

2017: "Awakening", taken from Apex

2019: "Northwest Passage", taken from Explorers

2019: "Heartless World", taken from Explorers

2020: "Abyss", taken from Abyss

2020: "Soulbound", taken from Abyss

2020: "Faster Than Light", taken from Abyss

2020: "Legacy", taken from Abyss

2022: "Falsewave", taken from Apex (Deluxe Version)

2022: "Acoustipex", taken from Apex (Deluxe Version)

Awards and nominations
Voted No. 6 in Exclaim Magazines Readers Choice Awards for Best Metal Albums 2009.

Voted Best Metal Band at the Whammy Awards in Vancouver for 2015.

Winners in the category of Metal/Hard Music Album of the Year in the 2021 Juno Awards.

References

External links 
 

Articles which contain graphical timelines
Canadian death metal musical groups
Canadian melodic death metal musical groups
Canadian power metal musical groups
Musical groups established in 2007
Musical groups from Vancouver
Musical quintets
Napalm Records artists
Juno Award for Heavy Metal Album of the Year winners